Shane O'Brien may refer to:
Shane O'Brien (ice hockey) (born 1983), Canadian ice hockey defenceman
Shane O'Brien (rower) (born 1960), former New Zealand rower
Shane O'Brien (fugitive) (born 1988), British murderer